The Cenomani (Greek: , Strabo, Ptol.; , Polyb.), was an ancient tribe of the Cisalpine Gauls, who occupied the tract north of the Padus (modern Po River), between the Insubres on the west and the Veneti on the east. Their territory appears to have extended from the river Addua (or perhaps the Ollius, the modern Oglio) to the Athesis (modern Adige).

Whether these Cenomani are the same people as the Cenomani in Gallia Celtica encountered by Julius Caesar is a subject of debate (see Cenomani).

Both Polybius and Livy expressly mention them among the tribes of Gauls which had crossed the Alps within historical memory, and had expelled the Etruscans from the territory in which they established themselves and subsequently continued to occupy. (Pol. ii. 17; Liv. v. 35.) 

Livy relates that about 400 BC, under the leadership of Elitovius (Livy V.35), a large number of the Cenomani crossed into Italy, drove the Etruscans southwards, and occupied their territory.

The statement of Cato (in Pliny, Nat. Hist. III.130), that some of them settled near Massilia in the territory of the Volcae, may indicate the route taken by them. 

It is remarkable that they appear in history almost uniformly as friendly to the Romans, and refusing to take part with their kindred tribes against them. Thus, during the great Gaulish war in 225 BC, when the Boii and Insubres took up arms against Rome, the Cenomani, as well as their neighbours the Veneti, concluded an alliance with the Roman Republic, and the two nations together furnished a force of 20,000 men, with which they threatened the frontier of the Insubres. (Pol. ii. 23, 24, 32; Strab. v. p. 216.) 

Even when Hannibal invaded Cisalpine Gaul they continued faithful to the Romans, and furnished a body of auxiliaries, who fought with them at the Battle of the Trebia. (Liv. xxi. 55.) After the close of the Second Punic War, however, they took part in the revolt of the Gauls under Hamilcar (200 BC), and again a few years later joined their arms with those of the Insubres: but even then the defection seems to have been but partial, and after their defeat by the consul Gaius Cornelius Cethegus (197 BC), they hastened to submit, and thenceforth continued faithful allies of the Romans. (Liv. xxxi. 10, xxxii. 30, xxxix. 3.) 

From this time they disappear from history, and became gradually merged in the condition of Roman subjects, until in 49 BC they acquired, with the rest of the Transpadane Gauls, the full rights of Roman citizens. (Dion Cass. xli. 36.)

The limits of the territory occupied by them are not very clearly defined. Strabo omits all notice of them in the geographical description of Gallia Cisalpina, and assigns their cities to the Insubres. Livy speaks of Brixia (modern Brescia) and Verona as the chief cities in their territory.

Pliny assigns to them Cremona and Brixia: while Ptolemy gives them a much wider extent, comprising not only Bergamum (modern Bergamo) and Mantua, but Tridentum also, which was certainly a Rhaetian city. (Strab. v. p. 213; Liv. v. 35; Plin. iii. 19. s. 23; Ptol. iii. 1. § 31.) 

It is singular that Polybius, in one passage (ii. 32), appears to describe the river Clusius (modern Chiese), as separating them from the Insubres: but this is probably a mistake. The limits above assigned them, namely, the Addua on the west, the Athesis on the east, and the Padus on the south, may be regarded as approximately correct. 

The Alpine tribes of the Camunni and the Triumpilini, which bordered on them on the north, are expressly described by Pliny as of Euganean race, and were not therefore nationally connected with the Cenomani, though in his time at least united with them for administrative purposes.

See also
Annea Clivana

References

Historical Celtic peoples
Gauls
Ancient peoples of Italy
Socii